"So Emotional" is a song by American singer Whitney Houston. It was released as the third single from her second studio album Whitney (1987) on October 12, 1987 by Arista Records. The song was written by Billy Steinberg and Tom Kelly and produced by Narada Michael Walden. It was also the last song Steinberg and Kelly wrote together. 

Commercially, it peaked at number five in the UK and number one in the Billboard Hot 100, where it became her sixth consecutive number one, and a dance chart hit. It would become the sixth best charting song of 1988, and was the fourth most played song on the club charts; it is her sixth biggest hit on the Hot 100 chart.

Composition
"So Emotional" was written by Billy Steinberg and Tom Kelly, who also penned Madonna's "Like a Virgin," Cyndi Lauper's "True Colors," Heart's "Alone," and The Bangles "Eternal Flame," all of which reached #1 on the charts. The song centers on Houston loving being in love, singing, "I get so emotional baby / Every time I think of you / I get so emotional baby / Ain't it shocking what love can do."

"So Emotional" was the final song recorded for the album. Arista President Clive Davis reportedly told Steinberg and Kelly that 10 songs had already been recorded but he was looking for one more uptempo song. The recording was overseen by producer Narada Michael Walden, who asked Houston to record the vocals on a day she was scheduled to make minor changes to existing tracks for the album. Walden asked Houston to record "So Emotional" first, before she had warmed up, resulting in a fresh, edgy sound. 

Although the recording became a number-one hit, the production was bittersweet for the songwriters. As Kelly explained in an interview, "If you fall in love with (your) version of the song, and you're to hearing it the way you conceived it ... it's always hard to get used to."

Critical reception
Allmusic editor Ron Wynn highlighted this track. Vince Aletti of Rolling Stone wrote: "Walden covers all these bases, out-hopping Kashif (but not Jellybean) with "So Emotional." St. Petersburg Times Eric Snider and Annelise Wamsley wrote: "So Emotional," the record's token rock offering, is hollow and contrived, as if the trumped-up power guitars are supposed to give the song some guts."

Chart performance
At this time Houston already had a string of five consecutive number-one hits on the U.S. Billboard Hot 100. "So Emotional" reached the top of the chart in January 1988, giving her six consecutive number-one singles, putting her in a three-way tie with The Beatles and The Bee Gees. Houston also broke Elvis Presley's long-standing record of achieving the most consecutive number one singles by a solo artist. It made its debut at number 47 on October 31, 1987 and after 11 weeks became the first number-one of 1988, eventually receiving gold certification. In January 2023, the song was certified platinum for sales of one million copies. The single remained in the Top 40 for 14 weeks, and also reached number one on Billboard's Hot Dance Club Play chart. "So Emotional" was ranked sixth on the Billboard Hot 100 year-end charts (1988). The song has sold over 1.7 million copies worldwide.

In the United Kingdom and France the song was remixed by Shep Pettibone when released as a single and peaked at #5 in the UK Singles Chart in November 1987, remaining in the chart for 11 weeks. Elsewhere the single performed moderately well reaching 21 in France, 26 in Australia and 30 in Switzerland.

Music video
The music video for "So Emotional", directed by Wayne Isham, features Houston on tour and preparing for the night's concert. It was filmed at Lehigh University's Stabler Arena in Bethlehem, Pennsylvania between dates of her 1987-1988 Moment of Truth Tour.

Track listings and formats
US 7" single
"So Emotional" – 4:36
"For the Love of You" – 4:29

UK 7" single
"So Emotional" (Edited remix) – 4:20
"For the Love of You" – 4:32

UK CD single
"So Emotional" (Extended remix) – 7:51
"Didn't We Almost Have It All" (live) – 6:28
"For the Love of You" – 4:32

Track 2: "Didn't We Almost Have It All" (live) is from her September 2, 1987 concert in Saratoga Springs, New York during the Moment of Truth World Tour.

Personnel

Narada Michael Walden – drums
Walter "Baby Love" Afanasieff – keyboards and synth bass
Corrado Rustici – guitar synth
Robert "Bongo Bob" Smith – drum sampling and percussion programming
Background vocals – Whitney Houston
Produced and arranged by Narada Michael Walden
Recorded and mixed by David Frazer
Assistant engineer – Dana Jon Chappelle
Additional engineers – Lincoln Clapp, Gordon Lyon, Jay Rifkin, Ken Kessie, Maureen Droney
Additional assistant engineers – Gordon Lyon, Stuart Hirotsu, Paul "Goatee" Hamingson, Noah Baron, Bill "Sweet William" Miranda, Ross Williams, Rob Beaton

Charts and certifications

Weekly charts

Year-end charts

All-time charts

Certifications

Popular culture 
Allison Shoemaker of The A.V. Club named eventual season winner Sasha Velour's lipsync to Whitney Houston's "So Emotional" in the season nine finale of RuPaul's Drag Race as the best TV performance of 2017.

In the music video for Childish Gambino’s 2018 promo single, "Feels Like Summer", Houston depicted in animated form - appears along with several other famous and iconic figures/people. Her look is based on the single cover for the 1987 single.

In S1 E2-E3 of the 2020 Netflix show Julie and the Phantoms, the character Alex Mercer (Owen Joyner) wears a "So Emotional" t-shirt. This is a play on his character being the emotional, sensitive one of the group. They were not allowed to use Whitney Houston's image.

The poster for the 2022 biopic I Wanna Dance with Somebody, was revealed with actress Naomi Ackie depicted as Houston in her “So Emotional” look. Much like the single cover/video Ackie is donning a leather jacket, tank top, jeans & boots with socks.

See also
List of Hot 100 number-one singles of 1988 (U.S.)
List of number-one dance singles of 1987 (U.S.)
List of number-one dance singles of 1988 (U.S.)
Billboard Year-End Hot 100 singles of 1988

References

External links
So Emotional at Discogs

1987 singles
1988 singles
Songs written by Tom Kelly (musician)
Songs written by Billy Steinberg
Whitney Houston songs
Billboard Hot 100 number-one singles
American rock songs
Dance-rock songs
Music videos directed by Wayne Isham
1987 songs
Arista Records singles
Song recordings produced by Narada Michael Walden